Trial is a 1955 American drama film directed by Mark Robson and starring Glenn Ford, Dorothy McGuire, Arthur Kennedy and Juano Hernandez. Based on the novel written by Don Mankiewicz, it is about a Mexican boy accused of rape and murder; originally victimized by prejudiced accusers, he becomes a pawn of his communist defender, whose propaganda purposes would be best served by a verdict of guilty.

Plot
Angel Chavez (Rafael Campos) is a Mexican-American teenager who lives in the small California town of San Juno. During an annual event called Bass Night held at the town beach, he wanders onto the beach, which is off-limits to Mexican Americans. There he meets a non-Hispanic girl he knows from high school, but she has a weak heart due to rheumatic fever and dies suddenly, and Angel is arrested.

On the grounds that her heart attack was caused by Angel's attempt to seduce her—which, as they were minors, would have been statutory rape even if consensual—he is charged with felony murder. A racist mob attempts to break Angel out of jail and lynch him, but the warden persuades them to stop by promising that the youth will be executed after a fair trial.

David Blake (Glenn Ford) is a law professor at the state university. He is told he must stop teaching until he has had some courtroom experience. Rejected by many law firms, he finds work at a small one run by Barney Castle (Arthur Kennedy). Castle wants to defend Angel and agrees to hire Blake to handle the case. Castle and Angel's mother (Katy Jurado) travels to New York City to raise money to defend Angel. Castle leaves his law clerk Abbe Nyle (Dorothy McGuire) to help Blake, and they fall in love.

Detectives working for Castle's firm uncover an attempt to tamper with the jury on behalf of the prosecution, but a new jury panel is called. Over a weekend break during jury selection, Castle calls Blake to New York to join him at a fundraising rally. Blake quickly realizes that Castle is primarily using the case as a propaganda and fundraising tool for a Communist group. Insulted at being used, Blake returns to San Juno to see the trial through to the end and represent Angel's interests.

Blake's trial strategy is to rebut the prosecution's case sufficiently that he does not need to present a defense. However, at the last moment, Castle returns and, using his influence on Angel's mother, threatens Castle with removal unless Angel testifies. Blake realizes that Castle wants the teen subjected to a harsh cross-examination that will ensure his conviction and execution; he then will be a martyr, and Castle will be able to use the case as a fundraising tool for the Communist Party.

Blake remains on the case, but the cross-examination goes as poorly as feared. Chavez is found guilty, and as the jury did not suggest leniency, the death penalty will be automatic. Castle then does have Blake fired to keep him from speaking during sentencing, but he arrives anyway and requests and receives amicus status.

Blake now says that, because the charge of murder was based on a technicality, it is appropriate for the judge to apply another technicality, Chavez's status as a minor, in sentencing. Instead of being hanged, the boy can simply be sent to reform school. When the prosecutor agrees that this would be fair, the African-American judge (Juano Hernandez) accepts the suggestion. He then sentences Castle, who has tried to race-bait him during Blake's argument, to 30 days in jail for contempt.

Blake and Abbe Nyle leave the court together.

Cast

 Glenn Ford as David Blake
 Dorothy McGuire as Abbe Nyle
 Arthur Kennedy as Barney Castle
 John Hodiak as District Attorney Armstrong
 Katy Jurado as Mrs. Chavez
 Rafael Campos as Angel Chavez
 Juano Hernandez as Judge Theodore Motley
 Robert Middleton as A.A. 'Fats' Sanders
 John Hoyt as Ralph Castillo
 Paul Guilfoyle as Cap Grant
 Elisha Cook Jr. as Finn 
 Ann Lee as Gail Wiltse
 Whit Bissell as Sam Wiltse
 Richard Gaines as Dr. Johannes Albert Schacter
 Barry Kelley as Jim Brackett
 Eddie Baker as Electrician (uncredited)
 Rodney Bell as  Lew Bardman (uncredited)
 Robert Bice as Abbott (uncredited)
 Frank Cady as Canford (uncredited)

 Hal K. Dawson as Nervous Man (uncredited)
 Charles Evans as Lawyer #1 (uncredited)
 Frank Ferguson as Kiley (uncredited)
 Joe Flynn as Speakers Bureau (uncredited)
 Leonard Freeman as Reporter (uncredited)
 Everett Glass as George - Law School Dean (uncredited)
 Dorothy Green as Mrs. Mary Ackerman (uncredited)
 Percy Helton as Youval (uncredited)
 Natalie Masters as Rally Chairman (uncredited)
 John Maxwell as Benedict (uncredited)
 Philo McCullough as Prospective Juror (uncredited)
 Mort Mills as Reporter (uncredited)
 Grandon Rhodes as Prof. Terry Bliss (uncredited)
 Charles Tannen as Bailiff (uncredited)
 Frank Wilcox as Lawyer #2 (uncredited)
 Harry Wilson as Courtroom Spectator (uncredited)
 Jean Wong as Chinese Girl (uncredited)
 Sheb Wooley as Butteridge (uncredited)	
 Wilson Wood as Airline Boarding Checker (uncredited)

Reception
According to MGM records, the film earned $2,312,000 in the U.S. and Canada and $993,000 elsewhere, resulting in a profit of $518,000.

Awards and nominations

See also
 List of American films of 1955

References

External links
 
 
 
 

1955 films
1955 drama films
Courtroom films
American black-and-white films
American courtroom films
American drama films
Films about lawyers
Films about race and ethnicity
Films critical of communism
Films directed by Mark Robson
Films featuring a Best Supporting Actor Golden Globe winning performance
Films scored by Daniele Amfitheatrof
Films set in California
Films set in New York City
Metro-Goldwyn-Mayer films
1950s English-language films
1950s American films